is a Peruvian-born Japanese futsal player. He plays for O Parrulo FS and Japanese national futsal team.

Career 
Morioka was born in Lima, Peru. In his childhood, he moved to Japan with his family. He graduated from Narita City Tomisato Elementary School and Funabashi City Katsushika Junior High School.

He participated in the 2012 FIFA Futsal World Cup, where he scored four goals, the most of anyone on the Japanese team.

In 2014, Morioka participated in the 2014 AFC Futsal Championship. Japan beat Iran in the final. In 2018, he participated in the 2018 AFC Futsal Championship. Japan was defeated by Iran in the final.

Titles

Club 
 F. League: 8
 Nagoya Oceans: 2007-08, 2008-09, 2009–10, 2010-11, 2011-12, 2012–13, 2013-14, 2014-15
 F.League Ocean Cup: 5
 Nagoya Oceans: 2009-10, 2010-11, 2011–12, 2012-13, 2013-14
 All Japan Futsal Championship: 4
 Nagoya Oceans: 2007, 2013, 2014, 2015
 AFC Futsal Club Championship: 2
 Nagoya Oceans: 2011, 2014

Japan National Team 
 AFC Futsal Championship: 1
 2014

Individual 
 F. League MVP: 4
 2007-08, 2011-12, 2013-14, 2014-15
 F. League Best 5: 6
 2007-08, 2011-12, 2013-14, 2014-15, 2015-16, 2017-18
 F. League Top Scorer: 4
 2011-12, 2012-13, 2013-14, 2014-15
 AFC Futsal Club Championship MVP: 1
 2014
 AFC Futsal Club Championship Top Scorer: 2
 2013, 2014

External links 
 Profile at FIFA.com
 Kaoru Morioka official facebook page at Facebook

1979 births
Living people
Peruvian people of Japanese descent
Peruvian emigrants to Japan
Japanese men's futsal players
Nagoya Oceans players